Baron Herman Severin Løvenskiold (30 July 1815 – 5 December 1870) was a Norwegian-born Danish composer, most noted for his score for August Bournonville's 1836 version of the ballet La Sylphide for the Royal Danish Ballet in Copenhagen.

Biography
Herman Severin Løvenskiold was born at Ulefoss in the municipality Nome, Norway. He was the son of Eggert Christopher Løvenskiold (1788–1861), director of the Ulefos Iron Works.  In 1829, his family moved to Denmark. He was trained in music by composer Peter Casper Krossing. He also went abroad where he studied in Vienna,  Leipzig and St. Petersburg. Following his return to Denmark, he composed music for a number of dramatic works at the Royal Danish Theatre. From 1851,  he was the organist at Christiansborg Castle Church  (Christiansborg Slotskirke) on Slotsholmen in Copenhagen. This church, which dated from 1738-1742, was frequently attended by members of the Danish Royal Family.

Notable works 
La Sylphide, ballet, 1836 
Hulen i Kullafjeld, Singspiel, 1839 
The New Penelope, ballet, 1847 
Turandot, opera, 1854 
Fra skoven ved Furesø, Concert Overture, 1863 (Op. 29)
Piano Quartet in F minor, Op. 26
"Ouverture til drammaet Konning Volmer og Havfruen", Op. 20 (published 1848 by Hornemann & Erslev)

References

Related Reading
Frydendal, Flemming (ed) (1998) Christiansborg Slot (Copenhagen: Slots- og Ejendomsstyrelsen) 
Hvidt, Kristian (1975)' Christiansborg Slot. Udgivet af Folketingets Præsidium (Copenhagen: Nyt Nordisk Forlag ) .

External links
Music Information Centre Norway
Danish Music: The Golden Age 1800-1850 

1815 births
1870 deaths
19th-century classical composers
19th-century male musicians
19th-century Danish composers
19th-century Norwegian composers
Herman Severin
]]Category:Danish classical composerars]]
Norwegian classical composers
Norwegian male classical composers
Danish Romantic composers
Norwegian Romantic composers
People from Ulefoss
Norwegian emigrants to Denmark
Musicians from Ulefoss